Steens Bridge railway station was a station to the east of Stoke Prior, Herefordshire, England. The station was opened in 1884 and closed in 1952.

References

Further reading

Disused railway stations in Herefordshire
Railway stations in Great Britain opened in 1884
Railway stations in Great Britain closed in 1952
Former Great Western Railway stations